Nicholas Gerald Beverley (born April 21, 1947) is a Canadian former professional ice hockey player and coach. Beverley played over 500 games in the National Hockey League (NHL) and later coached in both the NHL and American Hockey League (AHL).

Career
Beverley played for the Boston Bruins, Pittsburgh Penguins, New York Rangers, Minnesota North Stars, and Colorado Rockies, totalling 18 goals, 94 assists for 112 total points in 501 games played. He scored his first NHL goal as a member of the Boston Bruins in his team's 6-0 victory over the Buffalo Sabres on January 14, 1973 at Boston Garden.  It was the only goal Beverley scored as a Bruin.

Following his playing career, he became assistant coach of the Los Angeles Kings in 1981. He later became head coach of the New Haven Nighthawks of the AHL. Beverley spent a total of 14 years with the Kings holding a variety of positions including scout, assistant coach, head coach of minor affiliate, director of player personnel, assistant general manager and general manager. While in the position of general manager he led the Kings to their first Stanley Cup finals. After leaving the Kings, Beverley worked for the Toronto Maple Leafs as director of pro scouting, director of player personnel and as interim head coach when Pat Burns was released. As interim head coach, the Maple Leafs went 9–6–2 to finish the season. They made the playoffs, but lost in six games to the St. Louis Blues.

Following his time with the Leafs, Beverley joined his friend Mike Smith as assistant general manager of the Chicago Black Hawks. Following a big shakeup of the Blackhawks management, Beverley found himself unemployed with few prospects for jobs due to the looming work stoppage in 2004-05. In July 2005 he was signed as a scout for the Nashville Predators.

Career statistics

NHL coaching record

External links

1947 births
Living people
Boston Braves (AHL) players
Boston Bruins players
Canadian ice hockey defencemen
Chicago Blackhawks executives
Colorado Rockies (NHL) players
Ice hockey people from Toronto
Los Angeles Kings coaches
Los Angeles Kings executives
Los Angeles Kings players
Los Angeles Kings scouts
Minnesota North Stars players
Nashville Predators scouts
New York Rangers players
Oshawa Generals players
Pittsburgh Penguins players
Toronto Maple Leafs coaches
Toronto Maple Leafs executives
Toronto Maple Leafs scouts